Blalock is an unincorporated community in Rabun County, in the U.S. state of Georgia.

History
A post office called Blalock was established in 1888, and remained in operation until 1934. The community was located inland away from railroads.

References

Unincorporated communities in Rabun County, Georgia